The 13 Streets is an area in Ma Tau Kok, Kowloon City District, Hong Kong.

Orientation
It consists of 11 parallel short streets, bordered by Kowloon City Road (west), To Kwa Wan Road (east), Mok Cheong Street (north) and Ma Tau Kok Road (south). Their names are mostly related to auspicious animals, namely dragon, phoenix, deer, unicorn, eagle, lark, egret, cicada, swallow, horse and crane.

There are 83 buildings in the 13 Streets area, built between 1958 and 1960. They contain a total of about 2,500 residential flats and 418 shops at the street level. Due to lack of maintenance, the buildings are a in dilapidated condition.

The 11 parallel streets are, from west to east:
 Lung To Street (龍圖街)
 Fung Yi Street (鳳儀街)
 Luk Ming Street (鹿鳴街)
 Lun Cheung Street (麟祥街)
 Ying Yeung Street (鷹揚街)
 Pang Ching Street (鵬程街)
 Hung Wan Street (鴻運街)
 Shim Luen Street (蟬聯街)
 Yin On Street (燕安街)
 Tsun Fat Street (駿發街)
 Hok Ling Street (鶴齡街)

See also
 Cattle Depot Artist Village

References

External links

 Map showing the 13 Streets within the Kowloon City District

Ma Tau Kok